Pavel Oliva, born Pavel Ohrenstein (23 November 1923 – 5 March 2021) was a Czech classical philologist, historian of antiquity, writer and Holocaust survivor.

Works 
 Řecko mezi Makedonií a Římem, Academia, 1995. 
 Kolébka demokracie: dějiny a kultura klasického Řecka 5.–4. století př. n. l., Arista, 2000. 
 Zrození evropské civilizace, Arista, Epocha, 2003. 
 Holokaust mé rodiny, Arista, 2009.

References

 Memory of nations: Pavel Oliva

1923 births
2021 deaths
20th-century Czech historians
Czech Jews
Theresienstadt Ghetto survivors
Academic staff of Charles University
Classical philologists
Historians of antiquity
People from Prague